Gamavisión is a state-owned Ecuadorian television network. The network was one of Televisa's partners in Ecuador until 2016. The network belongs to financial Group Isaías and is owned by Company Teledos SA Pacific TV.

The channel began transmissions, on April 18, 1977. The station broadcasts as Channel 2 in Quito, Channel 8 in Guayaquil and Channel 9 in Cuenca.

References

External links 

Television channels in Ecuador
Television channels and stations established in 1977